The 2022–23 season is the 124th season in the history of Athletic Bilbao and their 92nd consecutive season in the top flight. The club are participating in La Liga and the Copa del Rey.

Players

First-team squad

Transfers

In

Out

Pre-season and friendlies

Competitions

Overall record

La Liga

League table

Results summary

Results by round

Matches 
The league fixtures were announced on 23 June 2022.

Copa del Rey

References

Athletic Bilbao seasons
Athletic Bilbao